Ton Duc Thang University (TDTU) is a public university of Vietnam. The school belongs to the Vietnam General Confederation of Labor.

The school operates under a fully autonomous mechanism. The school currently has a total of five campuses in four different cities including Ho Chi Minh City, Nha Trang, Bao Loc and Ca Mau.

History
The initial embodiment of Ton Duc Thang University was Ton Duc Thang Private
University of Technology, founded by decision 787/TTg-QĐ
on 24/09/1997 by the Prime Minister of Vietnam. With the rapid growth of the
university, and to have a legal status which fits with its nature (i.e. that it is a
university under the union structure and not completely private), the Prime Minister released decision 18/2003/TTg-QĐ
changing its name to Ton Duc Thang Semi-Public University,
under the management of the People's Committee of Ho Chi Minh City.

On 22/06/2006, Ton Duc Thang Semi-Public University moved
its organizational form to public university with a self-financing mechanism.

On 11/6/2008, Mr. Tan Dung Nguyen,
the Prime Minister of Vietnam, signed decision 747/QĐ-TTg changing
the name of Ton Duc
Thang Semi-Public University under the management of the People's Committee of
Ho Chi Minh City to Ton Duc Thang University under the management of the Vietnam General Confederation of Labour.

In the year 2020 Ton Duc Thang University draw public attention due to a corruption case. In July 2020 the president of TDTU, Mr. Le Vinh Danh, was suspended from his position by the authorities, initially for 90 days, due to allegations of abuse of power and misconduct. An audit by the government  resulted in his definitive removal in October 2020. The results of the audit were made public by the General Confederation of Labor in a press conference on 23 October 2020. Among others an abuse of the financial resources of the university by Mr. Le Vinh Danh was reported. This includes a salary much beyond the limits set by the regulations and personal profits from the interest rate of the university budget. Furthermore, Mr. Le Vinh Danh was not following the regulations on bidding and contracting for university projects, including a construction project that has been contracted to an unqualified company, endangering so public safety.

Accreditations 
In addition to the accreditation by Vietnam's Ministry of Education and Training, Ton Duc Thang University (TDTU) has been accredited by The High Council for Evaluation of Research and Higher Education (HCÉRES) who recognizes that Ton Duc Thang University (TDTU) complies with French and European standards for universities.

University rankings 

Ton Duc Thang University was ranked 623rd in Best Global Universities by the U.S. News & World Report in October 2020.TDTU was also ranked 123rd in Best Global Universities in Asia and its engineering subject was globally ranked 260th by this organization.

In August 2020, Ton Duc Thang University was ranked 701–800 by the Academic Ranking of World Universities (ARWU), known as Shanghai Ranking, which increased from the place of 901–1000 in 2019. 
Until now, TDTU is only one university in Vietnam on the list.

It was ranked 101 – 200 in 2019 THE University Impact Rankings by the Times Higher Education. In November 2020, the QS Higher Education Rankings (United Kingdom) ranked TDTU at 163rd in Asia's top universities (QS Asia University Rankings) Its facilities are rated 5-star and Teaching and Employability are rated 4-star by the QS Higher Education Rankings.

In December 2019, Ton Duc Thang University was ranked 960th by the University Ranking by Academic Performance (URAP).

The university is alleged to have "paid for fake affiliations" to artificially improve their research output and influence international rankings.

Academic organization 
Ton Duc Thang University is organized into 16 faculties. Combined, these faculties offer 38 graduate programs, 64 undergraduate programs, and 16 associate & vocational programs. The faculties are:

Accounting
Applied Sciences
Business Administration
Civil Engineering
Electrical Engineering
Environment and Labor Safety
Finance and Banking
Foreign Languages
Industrial Fine Arts
Information Technology
Labor Relations and Trade Unions
Law
Mathematics & Statistics
Pharmacy
Social Sciences & Humanities
Sport Science

Academic programs 
The following are the academic programs offered by Ton Duc Thang University.  For an explanation of the documentation codes present in the tables below (i.e. tests that applicants need to pass in order to apply), see Higher Education in Vietnam

International partnerships 
 California State University Monterey Bay has a study abroad program at Ton Duc Thang University.
 The Fulbright Scholar Program includes Ton Duc Thang University as a partner.
 The university offers scholarships for students from Cambodia to study at the masters and doctoral levels. This program was started in 2016 and initially included 20 scholarships.
 Since 2015, Ton Duc Thang University and the International Labour Organization have had a partnership for information sharing and to provide opportunities for students from TDTU to participate in international internships.
 In 2016, Sales & Marketing Executives International, which is an international forum designed to promote collaboration and industry standards, announced a partnership with Ton Duc Thang University to allow students to gain access to additional professional experiences and certification.
 The Business & Hotel Management School in Lucerne, Switzerland signed a memorandum of understanding with Ton Duc Thang University in 2017 to allow students from TDTU to study at BHMS and gain working experience in Switzerland.

Research output 
Ton Duc Thang University is the first university in Vietnam to have been granted a patent by the United States Patent and Trademark Office (USPTO). In 2015 four patents were granted by the USPTO.

For the period 1 August 2016 - 31 July 2017, Nature Index shows publications from Ton Duc Thang University in the journals Applied Physics Letters, Journal of Physical Chemistry Letters, and European Physical Journal C.

Facilities 

The school has its main campus at 19 Nguyen Huu Tho, Tan Phong Ward, District 7, Ho Chi Minh City with an area of 26 ha. In addition, there are 4 more satellite campuses: Ho Chi Minh City, Bao Loc, Ca Mau and Nha Trang. These exist in order to improve the learning and character of intellectual pursuits in these areas, to provide additional opportunities for study, and to reduce the infrastructure demand on the main campus. Schools are training in four facilities:
Facility 2 Ho Chi Minh City: 98-Ngo Tat To Street, Ward 19, Binh Thanh District, Ho Chi Minh City.
Bao Loc Office: Loc Tien Ward, Bao Loc City, Lam Dong Province
Nha Trang campus: 9 Pham Van Dong, Vinh Phuoc ward, Nha Trang city
Ca Mau Unit: Mau Than Street, Group 6, Ward 9, Ca Mau City, Ca Mau Province

Library and information systems on 500 computers connected to the Internet ensure students' learning needs, global information exploitation needs and the need for internal activities of the school.

Laboratory system, workshop for electrical engineering, electrical engineering, engineering, chemical technology, biotechnology, computer technology, etc. practice in the training of the school.

In addition to two fully equipped dormitories on campus which can house up to 2,160 students, Ton Duc Thang University also hosts high quality workout facilities. The main campus includes a sport complex for indoor games such as badminton, tennis, volleyball, basketball and many other recreational and athletic activities, including boxing. A swimming pool and a FIFA 2-star football stadium are located on campus.

The facilities at Ton Duc Thang University were rated in the top 200 worldwide by the UI Greenmetric World University Rankings in 2017 for its commitment to building a green educational environment and its use of solar panels on campus.  The university previously had been recognized by UNESCO for its environmental efforts.

References

External links
 

Universities in Ho Chi Minh City